Calpocalyx ngouiensis is a species of flowering plant in the family Fabaceae. It is found in Cameroon and Gabon.

References

Mimosoids
Flora of Cameroon
Flora of Gabon
Vulnerable plants
Taxonomy articles created by Polbot
Taxa named by François Pellegrin